"Lay It on Me" is a song by Australian singer-songwriter Vance Joy and released on 12 July 2017. It is the first single from his album Nation of Two.

The song premiered on Triple J on 13 July 2017, and is about being in a relationship and letting your defences down. Joy said "Lay It on Me" was recorded in Malibu, California and came together on the basis of an old phone recording looking for a home. "I wrote the guitar riff for this song in 2012 [and] I tried to write lyrics to it for ages. I remember being at SXSW in 2013/4 and just that riff was still there. The start of this year it all came together... once you have the right lyrics and ingredients the song comes together really quickly. I think Paul Kelly described them as odd socks, you have them lying around looking for another match."

At the ARIA Music Awards of 2018, the song was nominated for Song of the Year.

Video
The video was directed by Mimi Cave and was released on 12 July 2017.

Charts

Weekly charts

Year-end charts

Certifications

References

2017 singles
2017 songs
Vance Joy songs
Songs written by Dave Bassett (songwriter)
Songs written by Vance Joy